The Southern University Law Review is the flagship law review of Southern University Law Center in Baton Rouge, Louisiana.

Overview 
Founded in 1974, the Southern University Law Review is a student-published scholarly journal, published two times per year. It is listed in the Index to Legal Periodicals and Current Law Index. The publication addresses current legal issues through articles submitted by Southern University law students, legal scholars and professionals.

Past Editors-in-Chief

References 

American law journals